The Johnson-Tillotson House is a Western Colonial Revival home located in Willcox, Arizona, originally built circa 1900 by the Johnson family, a local ranching family, as their in-town residence.  It is an adobe structure, in a  2-story Queen Anne architecture.  It has a wood shingled high hipped roof, with boxed cornice eaves.  The main entry is an off-centered plain lintel wood door, with a wooden screen.  And the porch is a recessed platform with no railing, and its own gabled roof.

References

National Register of Historic Places in Cochise County, Arizona
Houses on the National Register of Historic Places in Arizona
Colonial Revival architecture in Arizona